Kronoby is a municipality of Finland. It is located in the province of Western Finland and is part of the Ostrobothnia region. The municipality is bilingual, with the majority speaking Swedish and the minority Finnish.

The neighbouring municipalities of Kronoby are Evijärvi, Kaustinen, Kokkola, Larsmo, Pedersöre and Veteli.

Kokkola-Pietarsaari Airport is located in Kronoby.

References

External links

Municipality of Kronoby – Official website 

Municipalities of Ostrobothnia (region)
Populated places established in 1607